Route 39 is a north–south state highway in Connecticut. It is one of the main roads in downtown Danbury.

Route description 

Route 39 begins at an intersection with Routes 37 and 53 in Danbury and heads north, crossing I-84. It continues through New Fairfield and Sherman, intersecting Route 37 twice, including a brief concurrency in Sherman, before ending at an intersection with Route 55. It also has a spur to the New York state line (see below) which continues into New York as Putnam County Route 66.

History
Route 39 was established as part of the 1932 state highway renumbering and originally connected Route 37 in New Fairfield and Route 55 in Sherman. The Danbury to New Fairfield portion (Clapboard Ridge Road to Warwick Road) was then known as Route 100. In 1934, Route 39 was extended west from New Fairfield center to the New York state line on the Danbury-New Fairfield town line. At the same time, Route 100 was renumbered to Route 37A.  In 1963, Route 37A was deleted and was assigned as a southward extension of Route 39. The former section to the New York line was redesignated as State Road 839.

Major intersections

References

External links

039
Transportation in Fairfield County, Connecticut
Danbury, Connecticut
New Fairfield, Connecticut